Moshkabad (also Romanized as Moshkābād) is a village in Soltaniyeh Rural District of the Central District of Soltaniyeh County, Zanjan province, Iran. At the 2006 National Census, its population was 407 in 103 households, when it was in Soltaniyeh District of Abhar County. The following census in 2011 counted 461 people in 143 households. The latest census in 2016 showed a population of 488 people in 150 households, by which time it was the newly established Soltaniyeh County. It was the largest village in its rural district.

References 

Soltaniyeh County

Populated places in Zanjan Province

Populated places in Soltaniyeh County